Tori Amos (born Myra Ellen Amos; August 22, 1963) is an American singer-songwriter and pianist. She is a classically trained musician with a mezzo-soprano vocal range. Having already begun composing instrumental pieces on piano, Amos won a full scholarship to the Peabody Institute at Johns Hopkins University at the age of five, the youngest person ever to have been admitted. She had to leave at the age of eleven when her scholarship was discontinued for what Rolling Stone described as "musical insubordination". Amos was the lead singer of the short-lived 1980s pop group Y Kant Tori Read before achieving her breakthrough as a solo artist in the early 1990s. Her songs focus on a broad range of topics, including sexuality, feminism, politics, and religion.

Her charting singles include "Crucify", "Silent All These Years", "God", "Cornflake Girl", "Caught a Lite Sneeze", "Professional Widow", "Spark", "1000 Oceans", "Flavor" and "A Sorta Fairytale", her most commercially successful single in the U.S. to date. Amos has received five MTV VMA nominations and eight Grammy Award nominations, and won an Echo Klassik award for her Night of Hunters classical crossover album. She is listed on VH1's 1999 "100 Greatest Women of Rock and Roll" at number 71.

Early life and education
Amos is the third child of Mary Ellen (Copeland) and Edison McKinley Amos. She was born on August 22, 1963,  at the Old Catawba Hospital in Newton, North Carolina, during a trip from their Georgetown home in Washington, D.C.,  and was named Myra Ellen Amos. Of particular importance to her as a child was her maternal grandfather, Calvin Clinton Copeland, who was a great source of inspiration and guidance, offering a more pantheistic spiritual alternative to her father and paternal grandmother's traditional Christianity.

When she was two years old, her family moved to Baltimore, Maryland, where her father had transplanted his Methodist ministry from its original base in Washington, D.C. Her older brother and sister took piano lessons, but Tori did not need them. From the time she could reach the piano, she taught herself to play: when she was two, she could reproduce pieces of music she had only heard once, and, by the age of three, she was composing her own songs. She has described seeing music as structures of light since early childhood, an experience consistent with chromesthesia:

At five, she became the youngest student ever admitted to the preparatory division of the Peabody Institute. She studied classical piano at Peabody from 1968 to 1974. In 1974, when she was eleven, her scholarship was discontinued, and she was asked to leave. Amos has asserted that she lost the scholarship because of her interest in rock and popular music, coupled with her dislike for reading from sheet music.

In 1972, the Amos family moved to Silver Spring, Maryland, where her father became pastor of the Good Shepherd United Methodist church. At thirteen, Amos began playing at gay bars and piano bars, chaperoned by her father.

Amos won a county teen talent contest in 1977, singing a song called "More Than Just a Friend". As a senior at Richard Montgomery High School, she co-wrote "Baltimore" with her brother, Mike Amos, for a competition involving the Baltimore Orioles. The song did not win the contest but became her first single, released as a 7-inch single pressed locally for family and friends in 1980 with another Amos-penned composition as a B-side, "Walking With You". Before this, she had performed under her middle name, Ellen, but permanently adopted Tori after a friend's boyfriend told her she looked like a Torrey pine, a tree native to the West Coast.

Career

1979–1989: Career beginnings and Y Kant Tori Read
By the time she was 17, Amos had a stock of homemade demo tapes that her father regularly sent out to record companies and producers. Producer Narada Michael Walden responded favorably: he and Amos cut some tracks together, but none were released. Eventually, Atlantic Records responded to one of the tapes, and, when A&R man Jason Flom flew to Baltimore to audition her in person, the label was convinced and signed her.

In 1984, Amos moved to Los Angeles to pursue her music career after several years performing on the piano bar circuit in the D.C. area.

In 1986, Amos formed a musical group called Y Kant Tori Read, named for her difficulty sight-reading. In addition to Amos, the group was composed of Steve Caton (who would later play guitars on all of her albums until 1999), drummer Matt Sorum, bass player Brad Cobb and, for a short time, keyboardist Jim Tauber. The band went through several iterations of songwriting and recording; Amos has said interference from record executives caused the band to lose its musical edge and direction during this time. Finally, in July 1988, the band's self-titled debut album, Y Kant Tori Read, was released. Although its producer, Joe Chiccarelli, stated that Amos was very happy with the album at the time, Amos has since criticized it, once remarking: "The only good thing about that album is my ankle high boots."

Following the album's commercial failure and the group's subsequent disbanding, Amos began working with other artists (including Stan Ridgway, Sandra Bernhard, and Al Stewart) as a backup vocalist. She also recorded a song called "Distant Storm" for the film China O'Brien. In the credits, the song is attributed to a band called Tess Makes Good.

1990–1995: Little Earthquakes and Under the Pink

Despite the disappointing reaction to Y Kant Tori Read, Amos still had to comply with her six-record contract with Atlantic Records, which, in 1989, wanted a new record by March 1990. The initial recordings were declined by the label, which Amos felt was because the album had not been properly presented. The album was reworked and expanded under the guidance of Doug Morris and the musical talents of Steve Caton, Eric Rosse, Will MacGregor, Carlo Nuccio, and Dan Nebenzal, resulting in Little Earthquakes, an album recounting her religious upbringing, sexual awakening, struggle to establish her identity, and sexual assault. This album became her commercial and artistic breakthrough, entering the British charts in January 1992 at Number 15. Little Earthquakes was released in the United States in February 1992 and slowly but steadily began to attract listeners, gaining more attention with the video for the single "Silent All These Years".

Amos traveled to New Mexico with personal and professional partner Eric Rosse in 1993 to write and largely record her second solo record, Under the Pink. The album was received with mostly favorable reviews and sold enough copies to chart at No. 12 on the Billboard 200, a significantly higher position than the preceding album's position at No. 54 on the same chart. However, the album found its biggest success in the UK, debuting at number one upon release in February 1994.

1996–2000: Boys for Pele, From the Choirgirl Hotel, and To Venus and Back

Her third solo album, Boys for Pele, was released in January 1996. Prior to its release, the first single, "Caught a Lite Sneeze" became the first full song released for streaming online prior to an album's release.

The album was recorded in an Irish church, in Delgany, County Wicklow, with Amos taking advantage of the church's acoustics. For this album, Amos used the harpsichord, harmonium, and clavichord as well as the piano. The album garnered mixed reviews upon its release, with some critics praising its intensity and uniqueness while others bemoaned its comparative impenetrability. Despite the album's erratic lyrical content and instrumentation, the latter of which kept it away from mainstream audiences, Boys for Pele is Amos' most successful simultaneous transatlantic release, reaching No. 2 on the UK Top 40 and No. 2 on the Billboard 200 upon its release.

Fueled by the desire to have her own recording studio to distance herself from record company executives, Amos had the barn of her home in Cornwall converted into the state-of-the-art recording studio of Martian Engineering Studios.

From the Choirgirl Hotel and To Venus and Back, released in May 1998 and September 1999, respectively, differ greatly from previous albums. Amos' trademark acoustic, piano-based sound is largely replaced with arrangements that include elements of electronica and dance music with vocal washes. The underlying themes of both albums deal with womanhood and Amos' own miscarriages and marriage. Reviews for From the Choirgirl Hotel were mostly favorable and praised Amos' continued artistic originality. Debut sales for From the Choirgirl Hotel are Amos' best to date, selling 153,000 copies in its first week. To Venus and Back, a two-disc release of original studio material and live material recorded from the previous world tour, received mostly positive reviews and included the first major-label single available for sale as a digital download.

2001–2004: Strange Little Girls and Scarlet's Walk
Shortly after giving birth to her daughter, Amos decided to record a cover album, taking songs written by men about women and reversing the gender roles to reflect a woman's perspective. That became Strange Little Girls, released in September 2001. The album is Amos' first concept album, with artwork featuring Amos photographed in character of the women portrayed in each song. Amos would later reveal that a stimulus for the album was to end her contract with Atlantic without giving them original songs; Amos felt that since 1998, the label had not been properly promoting her and had trapped her in a contract by refusing to sell her to another label.

With her Atlantic contract fulfilled after a 15-year stint, Amos signed to Epic in late 2001. In October 2002, Amos released Scarlet's Walk, another concept album. Described as a "sonic novel", the album explores Amos' alter ego, Scarlet, intertwined with her cross-country concert tour following 9/11. Through the songs, Amos explores such topics as the history of America, American people, Native American history, pornography, masochism, homophobia and misogyny. The album had a strong debut at No. 7 on the Billboard 200. Scarlet's Walk is Amos' last album to date to reach certified gold status from the RIAA.

Not long after Amos was ensconced with her new label, she received unsettling news when Polly Anthony resigned as president of Epic Records in 2003. Anthony had been one of the primary reasons Amos signed with the label and as a result of her resignation, Amos formed the Bridge Entertainment Group. Further trouble for Amos occurred the following year when her label, Epic/Sony Music Entertainment, merged with BMG Entertainment as a result of the industry's decline.

2005–2008: The Beekeeper and American Doll Posse

Amos released two more albums with Epic, The Beekeeper (2005) and American Doll Posse (2007). Both albums received generally favorable reviews. The Beekeeper was conceptually influenced by the ancient art of beekeeping, which she considered a source of female inspiration and empowerment. Through extensive study, Amos also wove in the stories of the Gnostic gospels and the removal of women from a position of power within the Christian church to create an album based largely on religion and politics. The album debuted at No. 5 on the Billboard 200, placing her in an elite group of women who have secured five or more US Top 10 album debuts. While the newly merged label was present throughout the production process of The Beekeeper, Amos and her crew nearly completed her next project, American Doll Posse, before inviting the label to listen to it. American Doll Posse, another concept album, is fashioned around a group of girls (the "posse") who are used as a theme of alter-egos of Amos'. Musically and stylistically, the album saw Amos return to a more confrontational nature. Like its predecessor, American Doll Posse debuted at No. 5 on the Billboard 200.

During her tenure with Epic Records, Amos also released a retrospective collection titled Tales of a Librarian (2003) through her former label, Atlantic Records; a two-disc DVD set Fade to Red (2006) containing most of Amos' solo music videos, released through the Warner Bros. reissue imprint Rhino; a five disc box set titled A Piano: The Collection (2006), celebrating Amos' 15-year solo career through remastered album tracks, remixes, alternate mixes, demos, and a string of unreleased songs from album recording sessions, also released through Rhino; and numerous official bootlegs from two world tours, The Original Bootlegs (2005) and Legs & Boots (2007) through Epic Records.

2008–2011: Abnormally Attracted to Sin and Midwinter Graces

In May 2008, Amos announced that, due to creative and financial disagreements with Epic Records, she had negotiated an end to her contract with the record label, and would be operating independently of major record labels on future work. In September of the same year, Amos released a live album and DVD, Live at Montreux 1991/1992, through Eagle Rock Entertainment, of two performances she gave at the Montreux Jazz Festival very early on in her career while promoting her debut solo album, Little Earthquakes. By December, after a chance encounter with chairman and CEO of Universal Music Group, Doug Morris, Amos signed a "joint venture" deal with Universal Republic Records.

Abnormally Attracted to Sin, Amos' tenth solo studio album and her first album released through Universal Republic, was released in May 2009 to mostly positive reviews. The album debuted in the top 10 of the Billboard 200, making it Amos' seventh album to do so. Abnormally Attracted to Sin, admitted Amos, is a "personal album", not a conceptual one, with the album exploring themes of power, boundaries, and the subjective view of sin. Continuing her distribution deal with Universal Republic, Amos released Midwinter Graces, her first seasonal album, in November of the same year. The album features reworked versions of traditional carols, as well as original songs written by Amos.

During her contract with the label, Amos recorded vocals for two songs for David Byrne's collaboration album with Fatboy Slim, titled Here Lies Love, which was released in April 2010. In July of the same year, the DVD Tori Amos- Live from the Artists Den was released exclusively through Barnes & Noble.

After a brief tour from June to September 2010, Amos released a live album From Russia With Love in December the same year, recorded in Moscow on September 3, 2010. The limited edition set included a signature edition Lomography Diana F+ camera, along with two lenses, a roll of film and one of five photographs taken of Amos during her time in Moscow. The set was released exclusively through her website and only 2000 copies were produced.

2011–2015: Night of Hunters, Gold Dust, and Unrepentant Geraldines
In September 2011, Amos released her first classical-style music album, Night of Hunters, featuring variations on a theme to pay tribute to composers such as Bach, Chopin, Debussy, Granados, Satie and Schubert, on the Deutsche Grammophon label, a division of Universal Music Group. Amos recorded the album with several musicians, including the Apollon Musagète string quartet.

To mark the 20th anniversary of her debut album, Little Earthquakes (1992), Amos released an album of songs from her back catalogue re-worked and re-recorded with the Metropole Orchestra. The album, titled Gold Dust, was released in October 2012 through Deutsche Grammophon.

On May 1, 2012, Amos announced the formation of her own record label, Transmission Galactic, which she said she intended to use to develop new artists.

In 2013, Amos collaborated with the Bullitts on the track "Wait Until Tomorrow" from their debut album, They Die by Dawn & Other Short Stories. She also stated in an interview that a new album and tour would materialize in 2014 and that it would be a "return to contemporary music".

September 2013 saw the launch of Amos' musical project adaptation of George MacDonald's The Light Princess, along with book writer Samuel Adamson and Marianne Elliott. It premiered at London's Royal National Theatre and ended in February 2014. The Light Princess and its lead actress, Rosalie Craig, were nominated for Best Musical and Best Musical Performance respectively at the Evening Standard Award. Craig won the Best Musical Performance category.

Amos' 14th studio album, Unrepentant Geraldines, was released on May 13, 2014, via Mercury Classics/Universal Music Classics in the US. Its first single, "Trouble's Lament", was released on March 28. The album was supported by the Unrepentant Geraldines Tour which began May 5, 2014, in Cork and continued across Europe, Africa, North America, and Australia, ending in Brisbane on November 21, 2014. In Sydney, Amos performed two orchestral concerts, reminiscent of the Gold Dust Orchestral Tour, with the Sydney Symphony Orchestra at the Sydney Opera House.

According to a press release, Unrepentant Geraldines was a "return to her core identity as a creator of contemporary songs of exquisite beauty following a series of more classically-inspired and innovative musical projects of the last four years. [It is] both one further step in the artistic evolution of one of the most successful and influential artists of her generation, and a return to the inspiring and personal music that Amos is known for all around the world."

The 2-CD set The Light Princess (Original Cast Recording) was released on October 9, 2015, via Universal/Mercury Classics. Apart from the original cast performances, the recording also includes two songs from the musical ("Highness in the Sky" and "Darkest Hour') performed by Amos.

2016–present: Native Invader, Christmastide and Ocean to Ocean

On November 18, 2016, Amos released a deluxe version of the album Boys for Pele to commemorate the 20th anniversary of the original release. This follows the deluxe re-releases of her first two albums in 2015.

On September 8, 2017, Amos released Native Invader, accompanied by a world tour. During the summer of 2017, Amos launched three songs from the album: "Cloud Riders", "Up the Creek", and "Reindeer King", the latter featuring string arrangements by John Philip Shenale. Produced by Amos, the album explores topics like American politics and environmental issues, mixed with mythological elements and first-person narrations.

The initial inspiration for the album came from a trip that Amos took to the Great Smoky Mountains (Tennessee-North Carolina), home of her alleged Native American ancestors; however, two events deeply influenced the final record: in November 2016, Donald Trump was elected President of the United States of America; two months later, in January 2017, Amos' mother, Mary Ellen, had a stroke that left her unable to speak. Shocked by both events, Amos spent the first half of 2017 writing and recording the songs that would eventually form Native Invader. The album, released on September 8, 2017, was presented in two formats: standard and deluxe. The standard version includes 13 songs, while the deluxe edition adds two extra songs to the tracklist: "Upside Down 2" and "Russia". Native Invader was well received by most music critics upon release. The album obtained a score of 76 out of 100 on the review aggregator website Metacritic, based on 17 reviews, indicating "generally favorable reviews".

On November 9, 2020, Amos announced the release of a holiday-themed EP entitled Christmastide on December 4, digitally and on limited-edition vinyl. The EP consists of four original songs and features her first work with bandmates Matt Chamberlain and Jon Evans since 2009. Amos recorded the EP remotely due to the impact of the COVID-19 pandemic.

On September 20, 2021, Amos announced her sixteenth studio album, Ocean to Ocean, which was released on October 29. The album was written and recorded in Cornwall during lockdown as a result of the COVID-19 pandemic and explores "a universal story of going to rock bottom and renewing yourself all over again". Amos embarked on a European and United States tour in support of the album in 2022, and is continuing to support the album with a European Tour in 2023. Matt Chamberlain and Jon Evans will again feature on drums and bass guitar respectively, their first collaboration with Amos on an album since 2009's Midwinter Graces.

She appeared at the EPIX original docuseries Women Who Rock which premiered on July 10, 2022.

In print
Amos and her music have been the subject of numerous official and unofficial books, as well as academic critique, including Tori Amos: Lyrics (2001) illustrated by Herb Leonhard, and an earlier biography, Tori Amos: All These Years (1996) by Kalen Rogers.

Released in conjunction with The Beekeeper, Amos co-authored an autobiography with rock music journalist Ann Powers titled Piece by Piece (2005). The book's subject is Amos' interest in mythology and religion, exploring her songwriting process, rise to fame, and her relationship with Atlantic Records.

Image Comics released Comic Book Tattoo (2008), a collection of comic stories, each based on or inspired by songs recorded by Amos. Editor Rantz Hoseley worked with Amos to gather 80 different artists for the book, including Neil Gaiman, Carla Speed McNeil, Mark Buckingham, C.B. Cebulski, Nikki Cook, Hope Larson, John Ney Reiber, Ryan Kelly, Pia Guerra, David Mack, and Leah Moore.

Tori Amos: In the Studio (2011) by Jake Brown features an in-depth look at Amos' career, discography, and recording process. Sing Us a Song, Piano Woman: Female Fans and the Music of Tori Amos (2013) by Adrienne Trier-Bieniek explores the ways women are represented in pop culture and the many-layered relationships female fans build with feminist musicians in general and with Tori Amos in particular.

Tori Amos' Boys for Pele (2018) by Amy Gentry uses a blend of memoir, criticism, and aesthetic theory in order to argue that the aesthetics of disgust are useful of thinking in a broader way about women's experience of all art forms. Amos released her second memoir, called Resistance: A Songwriter's Story of Hope, Change, and Courage on 5 May 2020.

Tori Amos: Little Earthquakes (2022) by Tori Amos and Neil Gaiman is an official graphic novel celebrating 30 years of Tori Amos' breakout album Little Earthquakes.

Personal life
Amos married English sound engineer Mark Hawley on February 22, 1998. 

Tori and her Husband Mark have 1 daughter, Natashya Lórien Hawley, born September 5, 2000.

Amos' mother, Mary Ellen, died on May 11, 2019.

Early in her professional career, Amos befriended author Neil Gaiman, who became a fan after she referred to him in the song "Tear in Your Hand" and also in print interviews. Although created before the two met, the character Delirium from Gaiman's The Sandman series is inspired by Amos; Gaiman has stated that they "steal shamelessly from each other". She wrote the foreword to his collection Death: The High Cost of Living; he in turn wrote the introduction to Comic Book Tattoo. Gaiman is godfather to her daughter, and a poem written for her birth, Blueberry Girl, was published as a children's book of the same name in 2009. In 2019, Amos performed the British standard "A Nightingale Sang in Berkeley Square" over the closing credits of Gaiman's TV series Good Omens, based on the novel of the same name written by Gaiman and Terry Pratchett.

Activism
In June 1994, the Rape, Abuse & Incest National Network (RAINN), a toll-free help line in the US connecting callers with their local rape crisis center, was founded. Amos, who was raped at knifepoint when she was 22, answered the ceremonial first call to launch the hotline. She was the first national spokesperson for the organization and has continued to be closely associated with RAINN. On August 18, 2013, a concert in honor of her 50th birthday was held, an event which raised money for RAINN. On August 22, 2020, Amos appeared on a panel called Artistry & Activism at the diversity and inclusion digital global conference CARLA.

Discography

Studio albums
 Little Earthquakes (1992)
 Under the Pink (1994)
 Boys for Pele (1996)
 From the Choirgirl Hotel (1998)
 To Venus and Back (1999)
 Strange Little Girls (2001)
 Scarlet's Walk (2002)
 The Beekeeper (2005)
 American Doll Posse (2007)
 Abnormally Attracted to Sin (2009)
 Midwinter Graces (2009)
 Night of Hunters (2011)
 Gold Dust (2012)
 Unrepentant Geraldines (2014)
 Native Invader (2017)
 Ocean to Ocean (2021)

Tours
 
Amos, who has been performing in bars and clubs from as early as 1976 and under her professional name as early as 1991, has performed more than 1,000 shows since her first world tour in 1992. In 2003, Amos was voted fifth best touring act by the readers of Rolling Stone magazine. Her concerts are notable for their changing set lists from night to night. 

Little Earthquakes Tour

Under the Pink Tour

Dew Drop Inn Tour

Plugged '98 Tour

5 ½ Weeks Tour / To Dallas and Back

Strange Little Tour

On Scarlet's Walk / Lottapianos Tour

Original Sinsuality Tour / Summer of Sin

American Doll Posse World Tour

Sinful Attraction Tour

Night of Hunters tour

Gold Dust Orchestral Tour

Unrepentant Geraldines Tour

Native Invader Tour

Ocean to Ocean Tour

Awards and nominations 
{| class="wikitable sortable plainrowheaders"
|-
! scope="col" | Award
! scope="col" | Year
! scope="col" | Nominee(s)
! scope="col" | Category
! scope="col" | Result
! scope="col" class="unsortable"| 
|-
! scope="row" rowspan=3|Brit Awards
| rowspan=2|1993
| rowspan=3|Herself
| International Breakthrough Act
| 
| rowspan=2|
|-
| International Solo Artist
| 
|-
| 1995
| International Female Solo Artist
| 
|
|-
! scope="row"|Critics' Choice Documentary Awards
| 2016
| "Flicker"
| Best Song in a Documentary
| 
| 
|-
!scope="row"|ECHO Awards
| 1995
| Herself
| Best International Female
| 
|
|-
! scope="row"|ECHO Klassik Awards
| rowspan=1|2012
| Night of Hunters
| The Klassik-ohne-Grenzen Prize
| 
|
|-
! scope="row" rowspan=4|GAFFA Awards
| 2000
| rowspan=3|Herself
| rowspan=2|Best Foreign Female Act
| 
| rowspan=2|
|-
| 2003
| 
|-
| rowspan=2|2022
| Best Foreign Solo Act
| 
| rowspan=2|
|-
| Ocean to Ocean
| Best Foreign Album
| 
|-
! scope="row"|George Peabody Medal
| 2019
| Herself
| Outstanding Contributions to Music 
| 
|
|-
! scope="row"|Glamour Awards
| 1998
| Herself
| Woman of the Year
| 
|
|-
! scope="row" rowspan=8|Grammy Awards
| 1995
| Under the Pink
| rowspan=3|Best Alternative Music Album
| 
| rowspan=8|
|-
| 1997
| Boys for Pele
| 
|-
| rowspan=2|1999
| From the Choirgirl Hotel
| 
|-
| "Raspberry Swirl"
| rowspan=2|Best Female Rock Vocal Performance
| 
|-
| rowspan=2|2000
| "Bliss"
| 
|-
| To Venus and Back
| rowspan=2|Best Alternative Music Album
| 
|-
| rowspan=2|2002
| Strange Little Girls
| 
|-
| "Strange Little Girl"
| Best Female Rock Vocal Performance
| 
|-
! scope="row"|Hollywood Music in Media Awards
| 2016
| "Flicker"
| Best Original Song in a Documentary
| 
|
|-
! scope="row"|Hungarian Music Awards
| 2010
| Abnormally Attracted to Sin
| Best Foreign Alternative Album
| 
| 
|-
! scope="row"|MTV Europe Music Awards
| 1994
| Herself
| Best Female
| 
|
|-
! scope="row" rowspan=4|MTV Video Music Awards
| rowspan=4|1992
| rowspan=4|"Silent All These Years"
| Best Female Video
| 
|rowspan=4|
|-
| Best New Artist in a Video
| 
|-
| Breakthrough Video
| 
|-
| Best Cinematography in a Video
| 
|-
!scope="row"|MVPA Awards
| 2000
| "1000 Oceans"
| Adult Contemporary Video of the Year
| 
| 
|-
! scope="row"|NME Awards
| 2016
| Under the Pink
| Best Reissue
| 
|
|-
! scope="row"|North Carolina Music Hall of Fame
| 2012
| Herself
| Inducted
| 
|
|-
!scope="row" rowspan=5|Pollstar Concert Industry Awards
| rowspan=2|1993
| rowspan=2|Little Earthquakes Tour
| Best New Rock Artist
| 
| rowspan=2|
|-
| Club Tour Of The Year
| 
|-
| 1995
| Under the Pink Tour
| rowspan=3|Small Hall Tour Of The Year
| 
| 
|-
| 1997
| Dew Drop Inn Tour
| 
| 
|-
| 1999
| 5 ½ Weeks Tour
| 
| 
|-
! scope="row"|Q Awards
| 1992
| Herself
| Best New Act
| 
|
|-
! scope="row" rowspan=2|WhatsOnStage Awards
| rowspan=2|2014
| rowspan=2|The Light Princess
| Best New Musical
| 
| rowspan=2|
|-
| Best London Newcomer of the Year
| 
|-
!scope="row"|Žebřík Music Awards
| 2001
| Herself
| Best International Female
| 
| 

1999: Spin Readers' Poll Awards (Won)

On May 21, 2020, Amos was invited to and gave special remarks at her alma mater Johns Hopkins University's 2020 Commencement ceremony. Other notable guest speakers during the virtual ceremony included Reddit co-founder and commencement speaker Alexis Ohanian; philanthropist and former New York City Mayor Michael Bloomberg; Anthony Fauci, director of the National Institute of Allergy and Infectious Diseases and a leading member of the White House Coronavirus Task Force; and senior class president Pavan Patel.

Film appearances
Amos appears as a wedding singer in the film Mona Lisa Smile. She previously auditioned for a role as a member of Beverly's band, Cherry Bomb, in the 1986 film Howard the Duck.

References

Citations

Works cited

External links

 
 
 

 
1963 births
20th-century American composers
20th-century American keyboardists
20th-century American women pianists
20th-century American pianists
20th-century American women singers
21st-century American keyboardists
21st-century American women pianists
21st-century American pianists
21st-century American women singers
Alternative rock keyboardists
Alternative rock pianists
Alternative rock singers
American alternative rock musicians
American expatriates in the Republic of Ireland
American expatriates in England
American women composers
American women singer-songwriters
American feminist writers
American harpsichordists
American mezzo-sopranos
American organists
American people who self-identify as being of Native American descent
American pop pianists
American rock pianists
American women rock singers
American rock songwriters
Articles containing video clips
Art rock musicians
Atlantic Records artists
Child classical musicians
Clavichordists
Deutsche Grammophon artists
Electronica musicians
Epic Records artists
Feminist musicians
Harmonium players
Island Records artists
Living people
Montgomery College alumni
Musicians from Baltimore
Musicians from Rockville, Maryland
People from Georgetown (Washington, D.C.)
People from Newton, North Carolina
People from Sewall's Point, Florida
Republic Records artists
Sexual abuse victim advocates
Singer-songwriters from Maryland
Singer-songwriters from North Carolina
Women organists
20th-century women composers
American women in electronic music
20th-century American singers
21st-century American singers
Singer-songwriters from Washington, D.C.
Y Kant Tori Read members